The Australian national cricket team visited Pakistan in October 1964 and played a single Test match, which was drawn, against the Pakistani national cricket team. Australia were captained by Bob Simpson, who scored a century in each innings, and Pakistan by Hanif Mohammad.

Only Test

References

External links

1964 in Australian cricket
1964 in Pakistani cricket
Australian cricket tours of Pakistan
International cricket competitions from 1960–61 to 1970
Pakistani cricket seasons from 1947–48 to 1969–70